Inventions is an American musical ensemble signed to Temporary Residence Records, consisting of Matthew Cooper of Eluvium and Mark T. Smith of Explosions in the Sky.

Inventions formed in 2013 as a side project for both musicians, whose main projects were signed to the same record label. In April 2014, the pair released an album which reached No. 22 on the Billboard Heatseekers chart.

Discography

Studio albums
Inventions (Temporary Residence Limited, 2014)
Maze of Woods (Temporary Residence Limited, 2015)
Continuous Portrait (Temporary Residence Limited, 2020)

EPs
Remixed (Temporary Residence Limited, 2015)
Blanket Waves (Temporary Residence Limited, 2015)

Singles
"Springworlds" (Temporary Residence Limited, 2015)

References

American experimental musical groups
American post-rock groups
Bella Union artists
Temporary Residence Limited artists